Little Brother is an EP by punk rock band Dead to Me. It was released in October 2008 on Fat Wreck Chords.

Track listing
 "Don't Wanna" - 2:36
 "Arrhythmic Palpitations" - 1:54
 "Little Brother" - 4:06
 "Ran That Scam" - 2:39
 "What's Wrong" - 1:45

2008 EPs
Fat Wreck Chords EPs
Dead to Me albums